Tržišče is a settlement in the Municipality of Rogaška Slatina in eastern Slovenia, right on the border with Croatia. The wider area around Rogaška Slatina is part of the traditional region of Styria. It is now included in the Savinja Statistical Region.

References

External links
Tržišče on Geopedia

Populated places in the Municipality of Rogaška Slatina